Joseph Veerasawmy (5 February 1889 – 12 April 1947) was ae cricketer from British Guiana. He played in three first-class matches for British Guiana from 1909 to 1923.

See also
 List of Guyanese representative cricketers

References

External links
 

1889 births
1947 deaths
Cricketers from British Guiana
Sportspeople from Georgetown, Guyana